Fleet is a village, civil parish and electoral ward in the South Holland district of Lincolnshire, England. The population of the civil parish, including Fleet Hargate, at the 2011 census was 2136.

In 1086, Fleet was listed as Fleot (Old English: the stream, estuary or creek), in the wapentake of Elloe in the Parts of Holland of Lincolnshire.
 
The Grade I listed Church of England parish church, dating from the late 12th century, is dedicated to St Mary Magdalene. The fabric is mainly Decorated in style, with Early English arcades and a Perpendicular west window. According to Cox (1916), the church was restored in 1860, when the chancel was rebuilt, although the canopied sedilia was retained. In 1964 Pevsner noted 1798 repairs and considered the church "over-restored". He dated a chancel rebuild to 1843, questioned if it was "done correctly", and recorded Victorian tracery in the aisle windows, a blocked doorway to a previous chapel in the chancel, "fine busts of great variety", a Decorated-style sedilia and piscina with ogee arches and crocketed gables, a reredos dated 1790, and a defaced 14th-century effigy.

Pevsner also recorded an 1854 red-brick rectory designed by Benjamin Ferrey and restored in 2005 by Steven Holmes and Peter Day. A motte south-west of the village where 11th- and 12th-century pottery has been found. The English Heritage record for the now ploughed-down motte site details finds from the Iron Age to the 18th century.

See also
 Fleet Hargate, a village within Fleet civil parish.
 Gedney, a village and civil parish to the east.

References

External links

"Fleet", Genuki.org.uk. Retrieved 29 July 2011

Villages in Lincolnshire
Civil parishes in Lincolnshire
South Holland, Lincolnshire